Krzysztof "Chris" Pozniak (born 10 January 1981) is a Canadian retired soccer player.

Club career
Pozniak emigrated from Poland with his parents Tadeusz and Elżbieta, and sister Kinga, to Canada in 1990. He is able to speak Polish.

He began his professional career with the Toronto Lynx at age 18. Poźniak has since played for FK Haugesund of the Norwegian Second division and Örebro SK of the Allsvenskan in Sweden.

On 22 November 2006, Toronto FC manager Mo Johnston announced the signings of Pozniak along with fellow Canadians Adam Braz and Marco Reda for TFC's inaugural season. In his first year at TFC, Pozniak featured in the defense and midfield acting as a backup and occasional starter.

On 21 November 2007, Pozniak was selected tenth by the San Jose Earthquakes in the 2007 MLS Expansion Draft. On 28 March 2008 he was traded to CD Chivas USA for John Cunliffe. In May 2008 he moved to Vancouver Whitecaps. He was released in July with a link to Europe.

Pozniak signed a one-year deal with Dundee on 7 August 2008 and left the club on 29 June 2009. At Dundee he scored once against Queen of the South.

On 30 July 2009, the Whitecaps announced that they had signed him for a second spell at the club. The deal lasted until the end of the season, and had an option for 2010, which was not picked up.

On 12 December 2012, it was revealed that FK Haugesund had released him from his contract with the club and the player was moving into retirement.

International career
Pozniak has been capped by Canada at the U20, U23, and senior levels. He competed in the 2001 FIFA World Youth Championship in Argentina. His first senior cap for Canada came in the 2002 CONCACAF Gold Cup against Haiti as a late game substitute. He has since earned a total of 24 caps, scoring no goals, and become an important contributing member for Canada's squad. He has represented Canada in 3 FIFA World Cup qualification matches.

Coaching career
On 29 April 2015, K-W United FC announced that Chris Pozniak would be the team's new head coach. He would lead United to an 11-2-1 season and the PDL playoffs. In the playoffs, United would beat the Des Moines Menace, Michigan Bucks, Seattle Sounders U23 and New York Red Bulls U23's to claim the PDL North American Championship. Pozniak is currently an assistant coach of Toronto FC II.

Career stats

References

External links

 (archive)

Player profile – Vancouover Whitecaps

1981 births
Living people
Footballers from Kraków
Polish emigrants to Canada
Naturalized citizens of Canada
Association football defenders
Canadian soccer players
Canada men's international soccer players
Canadian expatriate soccer players
Pan American Games competitors for Canada
Footballers at the 1999 Pan American Games
2002 CONCACAF Gold Cup players
2003 CONCACAF Gold Cup players
2005 CONCACAF Gold Cup players
2007 CONCACAF Gold Cup players
2009 CONCACAF Gold Cup players
Canadian expatriate sportspeople in the United States
Toronto Lynx players
Örebro SK players
FK Haugesund players
Canadian expatriate sportspeople in Sweden
Toronto FC players
Chivas USA players
Vancouver Whitecaps (1986–2010) players
Dundee F.C. players
Bryne FK players
Allsvenskan players
Norwegian First Division players
Eliteserien players
Major League Soccer players
USL First Division players
Expatriate footballers in Sweden
Expatriate footballers in Norway
Expatriate footballers in Scotland
Expatriate soccer players in the United States
Canada men's youth international soccer players
Canada men's under-23 international soccer players
Canadian soccer coaches
Canadian expatriate sportspeople in Scotland